Nanfen District is a district under the administration of the city of Benxi, Liaoning province, People's Republic of China.

Administrative divisions
There are two subdistricts and one town in the district.

Subdistricts:
Tieshan Subdistrict, Nanfen Subdistrict

The only town is Xiamatang

Townships:
Nanfen Township, Sishanling Manchu Ethnic Township

References

External links
Nanfen District Government website (Chinese)

County-level divisions of Liaoning
Benxi